Louis Thomas Midler (July 21, 1915 – August 29, 1992) was a Tackle in the National Football League.

Biography
Midler was born on July 21, 1915 in Saint Paul, Minnesota.

Career
Midler was drafted in the fifth round of the 1938 NFL Draft by the Pittsburgh Pirates and later played with the team during the 1939 NFL season. The following season, he played with the Green Bay Packers.

He played at the collegiate level at the University of Minnesota.

See also
List of Pittsburgh Steelers players
List of Green Bay Packers players

References

External links

1915 births
1992 deaths
Players of American football from Saint Paul, Minnesota
Pittsburgh Pirates (football) players
Green Bay Packers players
Minnesota Golden Gophers football players